The Super East Collegiate Hockey League (SECHL) is a collegiate club hockey league that plays at Division II of the American Collegiate Hockey Association (ACHA) at Division II. 

The SECHL is one of the top leagues competing at ACHA Division II and play at a similar skill level to ACHA Division I and NCAA Division III. Four previous SECHL members (Rutgers University, Drexel University, Stony Brook University, and New York University) have moved their programs to the ACHA Division I level. The league is very selective in accepting members and is made up of universities that recognize the importance of ice hockey.

Format
Each team plays 14 conference games during a season against fellow SECHL teams, with one on the road and one at their home venue. 

The top six teams qualify for the league playoffs which are held over the course of one weekend at the venue of the previous year's champion. All playoff games are single elimination with the winner advancing to the next round. The first and second seeds receive byes into the semifinal round while the remaining four teams play in the quarterfinals.

Current teams

Former members
Hofstra University Left the league in 2001
Monmouth University Left the league for the Mid-Atlantic Collegiate Hockey Association in 2001
New York University Jumped to ACHA D1 and joined the Eastern States Collegiate Hockey League in 2017
University at Albany Dropped to ACHA D3 in 2005
Stony Brook University Jumped to ACHA D1 and joined the Eastern Collegiate Hockey Association in 2007
Westfield State University Joined the league in 2002, left in 2005
Penn State University Joined the league in 2003, left for the Mid-Atlantic Collegiate Hockey Association in 2008
College of Holy Cross Joined the league in 2006, left for the Northeast Collegiate Hockey Association in 2016
William Paterson University Joined the league in 2008, jumped to ACHA D1 and joined the Eastern Collegiate Hockey Association in 2018
University of New Hampshire  ''left for the Northeast Collegiate Hockey Association
Rensselaer Polytechnic Institute

See also
American Collegiate Hockey Association
List of ice hockey leagues

Notes

ACHA Division 2 conferences